Ján Kollár (29 July 1793 – 24 January 1852) was a Slovak writer (mainly poet), archaeologist, scientist, Lutheran pastor, politician, and main ideologist of Pan-Slavism.

Life 
He studied at the Lutheran Lyceum in Pressburg (Pozsony, Kingdom of Hungary, now Bratislava, Slovakia). In 1817 he enrolled in the University of Jena. His attendance at the Wartburgfest (18 October 1817) has since been credited as being a formative experience with regards to his views on Pan-Slavism

He spent most of his adult life as a chaplain to the populous but poor Slovak Lutheran community in Pest (Kingdom of Hungary, today part of Budapest, Hungary). From 1849, he was a professor of Slavic archeology at the University of Vienna, and several times he also acted as a counselor to the Austrian government for issues around the Slovaks. He entered the Slovak national movement in its first phase.

His museum (since 1974) in Mošovce was installed in the former granary, which was the only masoned part of Kollár's otherwise wooden birth-house. The rest of the house burned down in a fire on 16 August 1863. In 2009 a replica was rebuilt of the original Kollár's birth-house, which is now a museum.

Views 
He worked out a conception of Slav reciprocity. He admitted 4 standard languages: Russian, Polish, Czechoslovak and Serbo-Croatian.

Works
Besides writing poetry he also wrote technical literature.

 Slávy Dcera (1824; The daughter of Sláva), collection of two (37 and 39 sonnets) cycles

In this work he worked out the conception of Slavic reciprocity. He expressed his feelings to a woman but this love had transformed to a love to his homeland. The main thematics of this work are:
•love 
•patriotism

It is divided into 5 chapters and it has a foreword.

Předzpěv (Prelude)
The author expressed his fears that the Slovaks will disappear from the face of Europe like other Slavic tribes before. He asked the Slovaks to ask for help from the Russian nation.

1. Sála   
This part contains love sonnets. Kollár glorifies his love Mína, depicting her as an ideal of a Slavic maid, the daughter of goddess Sláva.

2. Labe, Rén, Vltava
In these parts, the author takes us to places where Slavic tribes lived before. He is disappointed because these areas belong to foreign countries now.

3. Dunaj
The author arrives to Slovakia, disillusioned by the poverty of this area. He is highly disappointed and longs for death.

4. Léthé

5. Acheron
Mína becomes a fairy and takes the author to Slavic heaven and hell.

 O literární vzájemnosti mezi kmeny a nářečími slavskĭmi (Reciprocity Between the Various Tribes and Dialects of the Slavic Nation, edited and translated into English by Alexander Maxwell)

Legacy 

 Guta (Gúta) is a town in southern Slovakia with a Hungarian majority. It was renamed "Kolárovo" in 1948.
 Streets in Stara Pazova, Kisač, Padina and Belgrade in Serbia are named in his honor.
 The gymnasium in Bački Petrovac (Serbia) bears his name.

Gallery

References

External links 

 AUTY, R. Ján Kollár, 1793–1852. The Slavonic and East European Review, Vol. 31 (1952), No. 76: 74–91.
 KARÁSEK, J. Kollárova dobrozdání a nástin životopisný z roku 1849. V Praze: Česká akademie císaře Františka Josefa pro vědy, slovesnost an umění, 1903. 113 p. - available at ULB's Digital Library
 
 

1793 births
1852 deaths
People from Turčianske Teplice District
People from the Kingdom of Hungary
Slovak Lutherans
Slovak poets
Czech poets
Czech male poets
Slovak scientists
Slovak politicians
Slovak philologists
Linguists from Slovakia
Slovak philosophers
Mošovce
19th-century poets
19th-century male writers
19th-century Lutherans
Burials at Olšany Cemetery